George Russell Barker was a provincial politician from Alberta, Canada. He served as a member of the Legislative Assembly of Alberta from 1917 to 1921 sitting with the Conservative caucus in opposition.

Political career
Barker ran for a seat to the Alberta Legislature for the first time in the 1913 general election at the Conservative candidate in the Lac Ste. Anne electoral district. He was defeated by Liberal incumbent Peter Gunn in a hotly contested straight fight, losing by only 43 votes.

He attempted another run for a seat in the Legislature in the 1917 Alberta general election, again running in Lac Ste Anne. The election was hotly contested as Barker won by 34 votes over Liberal candidate Ralph Barker. The unofficial returns had Liberal candidate winning with a majority of one vote. Early in the counting Ralph Barker had conceded the race to George Barker. This was later reversed on a recount with George Barker picking up the district for his party.

Barker ran for another term at dissolution of the Legislature at dissolution in 1921. He also tried to win his seat back in the 1926 Alberta general election but was defeated finishing a distant second in the three-way race to Charles McKeen.

References

External links
Legislative Assembly of Alberta Members Listing

Progressive Conservative Association of Alberta MLAs
Australian emigrants to Canada
Politicians from Melbourne
Place of death missing
1881 births
1958 deaths